William Renshaw defeated Richard Richardson 6–4, 6–2, 6–3 in the All Comers' Final, and then defeated the reigning champion John Hartley 6–0, 6–1, 6–1 in the challenge round to win the gentlemen's singles tennis title at the 1881 Wimbledon Championships.

Draw

Challenge round

All comers' finals

Earlier rounds

Section 1

Section 2

Section 3

References

External links

Singles
Wimbledon Championship by year – Men's singles